Timothy P. Riley is an American music executive and formerly video game executive. He has worked on numerous video game titles including Call of Duty, Guitar Hero, DJ Hero, True Crime, Spider-Man: Shattered Dimensions and Tony Hawk: Shred and the film Couples Retreat. He is formerly the Vice President of Music Affairs at Activision Blizzard.

Early life and education

Riley was born in St. Louis, Missouri. Tim holds a BS degree in mass communications from Southeast Missouri State University.

Career

In his position with Activision Blizzard, Riley has worked with artists such as Eminem, The Rolling Stones, Jay-Z, Muse, Green Day, Lady Gaga, Taylor Swift, The Sex Pistols, Jimi Hendrix, Metallica to secure licensing rights for Activision Blizzard's video game franchises.

On August 14, 2013, he debuted the world premiere of Eminem's hit single "Survival" in the release trailer for Call of Duty: Ghosts at a live event in Los Angeles.

Prior to joining Activision Blizzard in 2003, Tim Riley worked in various positions in A&R with Jive Records-Zomba Publishing, Revolution/Giant Records/Warner Music Group and Geffen, as well as serving as showcase coordinator for the CMJ Music Marathon. He founded Westies Inc. and GO BIG! Entertainment, two bio-coastal music and entertainment lifestyle companies specializing in music supervision and licensing for films, video games and action sports videos.

Tim served as executive producer for Soundgarden's "Black Rain" and Megadeth's "Sudden Death".

During a live broadcast of a pitch session for Activision Blizzard, Tim Riley and Brandon Young, Director of Music Affairs, described in detail the process of submitting music for consideration in video games.

In a March 2014 interview with Complex Magazine, Tim Riley announced that he will be leaving Activision/Blizzard to form an independent branding and music company.

References

External links

Activision Blizzard
American business executives
Businesspeople from St. Louis
Living people
Year of birth missing (living people)